Yazd Airport  is an airport in Yazd, Iran. The airport lies 10 kilometers away from the city center of Yazd and serves the city as well as all of the surrounding counties. The Shahid Sadooghi Airport also serves as a part of the important North-South transportation corridor within the Islamic Republic of Iran. For administrative and census purposes, it is a treated as a village in Fajr Rural District, in the Central District of Yazd County, Yazd Province, Iran. At the 2006 census, its population was 127, in 33 families.

The airport was established in 1970 upon 575 hectares of land. Even though the airport does not have an international status, there are occasional charter flights as well as scheduled passenger services to neighboring countries such as Iraq and Syria. Furthermore, the airport provides routine international service to Jeddah and Medina in Saudi Arabia for the annual Hajj season.

Despite operating at 40-50% capacity, a total of 431,500 passengers traveled through Shahid Sadooghi Airport in 2012, making it the eleventh busiest airport in Iran in terms of passenger traffic and number of flight operations.

Airlines and destinations

See also
 List of longest runways

References

External links

Yazd County
Airports in Iran
Buildings and structures in Yazd
Transportation in Yazd Province